Harri Heikki Veikko Hurme (2 June 1945 – 23 September 2019)  was a Finnish chess FIDE Master (FM) (1980), International Solving Master (1993) and three-time Finnish Chess Championship silver medalist (1971, 1974, 1978).

Biography
In the 1970s, Harri Hurme was one of the top Finnish chess players. He won three silver medals at the Finnish Chess Championships (1971, 1974, 1978).

Harri Hurme played for Finland in the Chess Olympiads:
 in 1974, at the fourth board in the 21st Chess Olympiad in Nice (+5, =1, -5),
 in 1978, at the third board in the 23rd Chess Olympiad in Buenos Aires (+4, =2, -3),
 in 1980, at the third board in the 24th Chess Olympiad in La Valletta (+5, =2, -2).

Harri Hurme played for Finland in the World Student Team Chess Championships:
 in 1968, at the second reserve board in the 15th World Student Team Chess Championship in Ybbs (+5, =2, -3),
 in 1969, at the first reserve board in the 16th World Student Team Chess Championship in Dresden (+3, =2, -6).

Harri Hurme played for Finland in the Nordic Chess Cups:
 in 1973, at the sixth board in the 4th Nordic Chess Cup in Ribe (+2, =3, -0),
 in 1974, at the fourth board in the 5th Nordic Chess Cup in Eckernförde (+1, =2, -2).

Harri Hurme won several competitions in chess composition. Some of his chess problems were included in the FIDE Album (1971-1973).

Chess composition 

Competition Lindroos JT 71 (2nd prize), FIDE Album (1971—1973).

1. Ke6!

1... Ke4 2. Rg3+ Kf4 3. Be5#

1... Kf4 2. Rg1 g5 3. Be5#

1... g5 2. Be5 Ke4 (2... g4 3. Rh2#) 3. Rg3#

Competition «Subotica Internet Ty.», 2009 (2nd prize)

1. Bf5! (1. e7? Qg8!).

References

External links

Harri Hurme chess games at 365chess.com

1945 births
2019 deaths
Finnish chess players
Chess FIDE Masters
Chess Olympiad competitors
Chess composers